Hieracium amplexicaule (also called sticky hawkweed) is a species of plant from the family Asteraceae.

References

amplexicaule
Plants described in 1753
Taxa named by Carl Linnaeus